Naqadeh and Oshnavieh (electoral district) is the 9th electoral district in the West Azerbaijan Province of Iran. It has a population of 191,632 and elects 1 member of parliament.

1980
MP in 1980 from the electorate of Naqadeh. (1st)
 Asghar Rostami

1984
MP in 1984 from the electorate of Naqadeh. (2nd)
 Ali Parizad

1988
MP in 1988 from the electorate of Naqadeh. (3rd)
 Abdolrahman Hoseini

1992
MP in 1992 from the electorate of Naqadeh. (4th)
 Rasoul Pourzaman

1996
MP in 1996 from the electorate of Naqadeh. (5th)
 Saleh Akbari

2000
MP in 2000 from the electorate of Naqadeh and Oshnavieh. (6th)
 Maghsud Azami

2004
MP in 2004 from the electorate of Naqadeh and Oshnavieh. (7th)
 Rasoul Pourzaman

2008
MP in 2008 from the electorate of Naqadeh and Oshnavieh. (8th)
 Ali Zanjani Hasanluei

2012
MP in 2012 from the electorate of Naqadeh and Oshnavieh. (9th)
 Abdolkarim Hoseinzadeh

2016

Notes

References

Electoral districts of West Azerbaijan
Naqadeh County
Oshnavieh County